is a railway station in the city of  Tahara, Aichi Prefecture, Japan, operated by the  Public–private partnership Toyohashi Railroad.

Lines
Yagumadai Station is a station of the Atsumi Line, and is located 14.0 kilometers from the starting point of the line at Shin-Toyohashi Station.

Station layout
The station has one side platform serving a single bi-directional track. The station is unattended.

Adjacent stations

|-
!colspan=5|Toyohashi Railroad

Station history
Yagumadai Station was established on January 22, 1924 as a station on the privately held Atsumi Railroad. The Atsumi Railroad was merged into the Nagoya Railroad on September 1, 1940. The station was closed on June 5, 1944. It was reopened on April 1, 1971 as a station on the Toyohashi Railroad.

Passenger statistics
In fiscal 2016, the station was used by an average of 195 passengers daily.

Surrounding area
Japan National Route 259

See also
 List of railway stations in Japan

References

External links

Toyohashi Railway Official home page

Railway stations in Aichi Prefecture
Railway stations in Japan opened in 1924
Tahara, Aichi